Euphaedra alava is a butterfly in the family Nymphalidae. It is found in Equatorial Guinea.

References

Butterflies described in 2000
alava
Endemic fauna of Equatorial Guinea
Butterflies of Africa